Lepidotrichidae is a family of basal insects belonging to the order Zygentoma (silverfish and allies) The family contains the extinct Lepidotrix, known from specimens preserved in Eocene aged European amber. The extant genus Tricholepidion, which contains a single species, Tricholepidion gertschi from western North America, has also been typically considered a member of the family. However, some more recent research has suggested that the two genera are not particularly closely related, and Tricholepidion should instead be assigned to its own family Tricholepidiidae.

References

External links
Lepidotrichidae. Integrated Taxonomic Information System (ITIS).

Insect families
Taxa named by Filippo Silvestri